The Changhe Q35 is a compact crossover produced by Changhe unveiled during the 2016 Chengdu Auto Show in China,

Overview

The Changhe Q35 is powered by a 1.5 liter Inline-four engine producing 85kW and 148 Nm. The pricing of the Changhe Q35 starts at 65,900 yuan and ends at 89,900 yuan.

References

External links 

Compact sport utility vehicles
Crossover sport utility vehicles
Changhe vehicles
2010s cars
Cars introduced in 2016
Cars of China